King of All Kings may refer to:

 King of All Kings (Hate Eternal album), 2002
 King of All Kings (Pastor Troy album), 2010

See also
 King of Kings (disambiguation)
Samrat (disambiguation), Indian title, literally "king of all"
Chakravarti (disambiguation), title for an emperor in ancient India, literally "universal ruler"